is a Japanese professional footballer who plays as a forward for J2 League side Fagiano Okayama, on loan from Gamba Osaka.

Club career
Sakamoto made his professional debut for J3 League side Gamba Osaka U-23, the reserve team of Gamba Osaka on 19 September 2020 against Vanraure Hachinohe. He came on as an 86th-minute substitute for Ko Ise as Gamba Osaka U-23 lost 2–3. Sakamoto scored his first goal for Gamba Osaka U-23 on 6 December 2020 against Azul Claro Numazu. He scored in the 87th minute from the penalty spot to give Osaka the 2–1 victory.

On 29 December 2022, Sakamoto official loan transfer to Fagiano Okayama for ahead of 2023 season.

Career statistics

Club
.

References

External links

Profile at Gamba Osaka

2003 births
Living people
Japanese footballers
Association football forwards
J1 League players
J2 League players
J3 League players
Gamba Osaka U-23 players
Gamba Osaka players
Fagiano Okayama players